The 1957–58 season was Newport County's 30th season in the Football League and the last season in the Third Division South before the regional third divisions were consolidated into new Third and Fourth Divisions. County's 11th-place finish qualified them for next season's Third Division.

Season review

Results summary

Results by round

Fixtures and results

Third Division South

FA Cup

Welsh Cup

League table

P = Matches played; W = Matches won; D = Matches drawn; L = Matches lost; F = Goals for; A = Goals against; GA = Goal average; Pts = Points

External links
 Newport County 1957-1958 : Results
 Newport County football club match record: 1958
 Welsh Cup 1957/58

References

1957-58
English football clubs 1957–58 season
1957–58 in Welsh football